Melbourne Magazine was an Australian television series that aired on Melbourne station ABV-2. The series debuted 16 January 1957 and ended on 18 December 1957. For most of its run, Melbourne Magazine was a fortnightly series.

A weekly series broadcast on Wednesdays, Melbourne Magazine aired live and featured Corinne Kerby as the host for the first few episodes, with the rest of the series hosted by Reg Neal. The series is described as featuring "interviews with prominent personalities".

References

External Links

1957 Australian television series debuts
1957 Australian television series endings
Australian non-fiction television series
Australian live television series
English-language television shows
Black-and-white Australian television shows
Australian Broadcasting Corporation original programming